Tunku Besar Burhanuddin ibni Almarhum Yamtuan Antah  (22 September 1878 – 5 July 1961) was a member of the Negeri Sembilan royal family and once served as regent of Negeri Sembilan. His father was Yamtuan Antah ibni Yamtuan RadIn, who served as the 6th Yamtuan Besar (now known as Yang di-Pertuan Besar of Negeri Sembilan) from 1869 to 1888. Tunku Burhanuddin's elder brother, Tuanku Muhammad became the 7th Yamtuan Besar and the first to use the title Yang di-Pertuan Besar upon Yamtuan Antah's death.

The title
Tunku Besar (Malay literally meaning "great prince") is the title of the heir presumptive of the throne of Negeri Sembilan, Malaysia. In ancient times it was also the title of the heir apparent of Melaka, Johor, Pahang (all in Malaysia) as well as several Malay sultanates in Sumatra, Indonesia.

Genealogy
Tunku Burhanuddin is best known as father of Negeri Sembilan queens. Three of his daughters served as Tunku Ampuan or Queen consorts. His eldest daughter, Tunku Kurshiah binti Almarhum Tunku Besar Burhanuddin was married to Tuanku Abdul Rahman and was Tunku Ampuan from 1933. She was succeeded as Tunku Ampuan by her sister and Tunku Burhanuddin's second daughter, Tunku Ampuan Durah, who was married to Tunku Munawir. Tunku Burhanuddin's youngest daughter, Tuanku Najihah is the current Tunku Ampuan of Negeri Sembilan. She was formerly the Tunku Ampuan Besar or Queen of Negeri Sembilan from 1967 to 2008, when she ascended to the throne.

Both Tunku Kurshiah and Tuanku Najihah also served a five-year term as Raja Permaisuri Agong or Queen of Malaysia.

His granddaughter, Tuanku Bahiyah, daughter of Tunku Kurshiah, was Sultanah of Kedah and also served a term as Raja Permaisuri Agong. His grandson, Tuanku Muhriz, son of Tunku Ampuan Durah is the current Yang di-Pertuan Besar of Negeri Sembilan.

Tunku Besar Burhanuddin died in 1961.

Foreign honours
 :
 Honorary Companion of the Order of St Michael and St George (CMG, 3 June 1935)

References

Yang di-Pertuan Besar of Negeri Sembilan
1878 births
1961 deaths
Royal House of Negeri Sembilan
Sons of monarchs